Cobrys or Kobrys was a coastal Greek town in ancient Thrace, on the Thracian Chersonesus. It is mentioned in the Periplus of Pseudo-Scylax

It was an Emporium of the Cardia.

There have been unconvincing attempts to identify Cobrys with Crobyle. Cobrys' site is located 1 mile (1.6 km) south of Kavak Suyu, in European Turkey.

See also
Greek colonies in Thrace

References

Populated places in ancient Thrace
Former populated places in Turkey
History of Çanakkale Province